María del Carmen Betancourt y Molina (1758 in Los Realejos – 1824 in Puerto de la Cruz) was a Spanish inventor based in the Canary Islands, best remembered for her first design, an epicyclindrical machine for twining silk, developed alongside her brothers Agustín de Betancourt and Jose de Betancourt y Castro. The siblings presented her design of the epicylindrical machine to the Royal Economic Society of Friends of the Country of Tenerife, in 1778.

In addition, she made the first tape of woven velvet on the island. She also worked on a recipe for dyes, betting on the modernization of the silk industry, thanks to her excellent knowledge of silkworms. For all these reasons, she is considered a science pioneer in the Canary Islands.

Biography 
María del Carmen Betancourt y Molina was born the third of eleven siblings and she became a research enthusiast as a child. Her parents were Leonor de Molina y Briones, daughter of the Marquises of Villafuerte, and Agustín de Betancourt y Castro, mayorazgo of her house, knight of the Order of Calatrava and lieutenant colonel of the Royal Armies. Her family was related to King Jean IV de Béthencourt, who, by participating in the conquest of the Canary Islands, obtained the title of Lord of the Canary Islands. Her father was a founding member of the Royal Economic Society of Friends of the Country of Tenerife in La Laguna. In 1778, it was precisely in the newly created Society that she presented her first design, an epicylindrical machine for twining silk, made in collaboration with her brother, Agustín de Betancourt y Molina.

Despite being separated since the age of twenty, she maintained an ongoing epistolary relationship with her second brother, the prestigious Canarian engineer and inventor Agustín de Betancourt y Molina. They were both born in the same year, 1758, and also both died in the same year, 1824. Throughout her life she lived in the family home, directly involved in the problems generated by the silk manufacturing industry and the attempts to improve the quality and production of this practice.

In addition to being co-author of the epicylindrical machine, she also presented to the Sociedad Económica de la Laguna, in 1779, the document entitled Economic method for fine crimson dyes, which includes two recipes for silk dyes together with some samples of fabric dyed following recipe directions.

She died unmarried in Puerto de la Cruz.

Questionable research 
In practically all the relevant studies on the silk manufacturing industry on the island of Tenerife, María has been considered a Poor Clare Nun from La Orotava, but later evidence has been presented of the error of such an affirmation. Very probably her report on how to obtain the crimson color constitutes the first scientific report signed by a woman in the Canary Islands.

Legacy 
In March 2018, the Government of the Canary Islands announced the creation of a line of subsidies that bears her name. The María del Carmen Betancourt y Molina research support program aims to encourage female leadership in this area.

References 

1758 births
1824 deaths
Spanish inventors
People from Puerto de la Cruz
18th-century Spanish women
18th-century inventors
Women inventors
Tenerife